Georgiana-Andreia Ciuciulete (née Coadălată) is a Romanian handballer who plays as a line player for Corona Brașov.

International honours
EHF Cup:
Finalist: 2012
Semifinalist: 2013, 2016

References

 

1987 births
Living people
People from Băilești
Romanian female handball players